This is a list of members of the Western Australian Legislative Council from June 1872 to September 1874. The chamber had 18 members, as specified by the Legislative Council Act 1870 (33 Vict, No. 13). Section 1 of this Act specified that a minimum of one-third of the Council would be appointed by the Crown. Three of these were official nominees who were part of the Continuous Ministry—namely the Colonial Secretary, Attorney-General and the Surveyor-General—while the remaining three were "non-official nominees". All other positions were elected.

An amendment proclaimed on 15 January 1874 expanded the Council from 18 to 21 seats, adding two elected and one nominee member.

Notes
  In December 1872, Attorney-General Robert Walcott resigned. George Walpole Leake was appointed to replace him in the Council until Henry Hocking took up his duties in March 1873.
  On 25 November 1872, Edward Newman, one of the two members for Fremantle, died. At the resulting by-election on 26 December, William Marmion, already a nominee member of the Council, was elected. He transferred to the elective seat, and Thomas Cockburn-Campbell was nominated in his stead.
  On 28 November 1872, William Locke Brockman, the member for Swan, died. At the close of nominations on 26 December for the resulting by-election, Walter Padbury was returned unopposed.
  On 8 February 1873, James Drummond, the member for Toodyay, died. At the close of nominations on 4 March for the resulting by-election, Charles Dempster was returned unopposed.
  On 5 July 1873, the result of the 1872 election for Greenough was voided, and George Shenton ceased to be a member of the Council. At a by-election on 22 July 1873, Charles Crowther was elected.

Sources
 

Members of Western Australian parliaments by term